Natore district is a district of Rajshahi Division located in northern Bangladesh. It borders the metropolitan city of Rajshahi and used to be a part of Rajshahi district.

History
Natore was the District Headquarters of Rajshahi from 1769 to 1825. Administrative Natore subdivision was established in 1825 under Rajshahi district, on the eve of the shifting of the headquarters.

During the Bangladesh Liberation War in 1971, a battle was fought between the Pakistani army and the freedom fighters of Mukti Bahini on March 29. About 40 members of the Pakistani army including Major Aslam and Captain Ishaq were killed. On 5 May 1971 Pakistani Army killed 42 employees of North Bengal Sugar Mills (Lalpur) including the general manager of the mill, Lieutenant Anwarul Azim. They were killed near a pond in the mill campus. The pond is now known as Shaheed Sagar, and there is a memorial beside the pond.

Geography

Most parts of Natore district are plain land. Chalan Beel, the largest beel in Bangladesh, is a part of the district.

It is bordered by Naogaon and Bogra districts to the north, Pabna and Kushtia districts to the south, Pabna and Sirajganj districts to the east, and Rajshahi district to the west. The road distance from Natore to Dhaka is 220 kilometres. Lalpur is the lowest Average annual rainfall area of Bangladesh.

Etymology
In 1845, Natore Mahakuma was established. The Natore Municipality was established in 1869.

Economy

The economy of Natore is based on agriculture.

There are 2 sugar mills in Natore; North Bengal Sugar Mills Limited and Natore Sugar Mills Limited. They are the enterprises of the Bangladesh Sugar & Food Industries Corporation. Pran Agro Ltd., Ekdala, Natore Sadar (2005) is a private food manufacturing plant of Pran-RFL Group. Jamuna Distillery Limited (1995) is another private industry of Jamuna Group. The distillery produces industrial alcohol, and is situated near Natore Sugar Mills Limited.

Hats, bazaars and fairs
The total number of hats and bazaars are 152. There are 13 fairs. Tebaria Hat, (which is situated 3 km from Natore town) is a traditional hat which sits every Sunday. Tebaria is one of the biggest hats of Natore and Bangladesh.

Demographics 

According to the 2011 Bangladesh census, Natore District had a population of 1,706,673, of which 854,183 were males and 852,490 females. Rural population was 1,478,665 (86.64%) while the urban population was 228,008 (13.36%). Natore district had a literacy rate of 49.59% for the population 7 years and above: 51.90% for males and 47.29% for females.

Muslims make up 93.22% of the population, while Hindus are 6.08% of the population. The Muslim population has constantly increased, while the Hindu population has generally decreased. The ethnic population is 11,912, mainly Santals and Oraons.

Administrative structure

Upazilas
Natore was the district headquarters of Rajshahi from 1769–1825. At the eve of that replacement, Natore was declared as a Subdivision. That event made Natore the first Subdivision of Bangladesh. Natore was established as a district in 1984.

There are seven upazilas in the district:
 Bagatipara Upazila
 Baraigram Upazila
 Gurudaspur Upazila
 Lalpur Upazila
 Naldanga Upazila
 Natore Sadar Upazila
 Singra Upazila

Pourasavas 
There are eight pourasavas in Natore district, 4 of them being the seat of upazilas (sub-districts). They are:
 Bagatipara (Bagatipara upazila)
 Bonpara (Baraigram upazila)
 Boraigram (Baraigram Upazila)
 Gurudaspur
 Lalpur Upazila
 Naldanga (Naldanga Upazila)
 Natore
 Singra

Natore town
The town has a population of 120,000; male population percentage is 51.57%, female population percentage is 48.43%. The density of population is 4,825. Chalkbuddhnath, Station bajar, Borgasa,
Alaipur, Kanaikhali, Nichabazar, Lalbazar, Madrasamor, Bongojal are the most populated areas of Natore Town. The mayor is Uma Choudhury.

Administration

The Deputy Commissioner is Mohammad Shamim Ahmed. The Superintendent of Police is Liton Kumar Shaha and the Administrator of Zila Porishod is Advocate Sajedur Rahman Khan Chowdhury.

Points of interest
Tourist attractions in Natore include Rani Bhabanir Rajbari, the palace of Rani Bhabani of Natore. It is a historical palace, situated in the Bongojol area nearby Natore zero (Madrasamore/old bus stand). There is a college and schools named after Rani Bhobani.

Chalan Beel is a large natural wetland. During the monsoon, the area of the Bil increases and touches four upazilas (sub-districts) of the district. The picnic parties come to Cholon Bil every season. 

Uttara Gonobhaban (formerly known as Dighapotia Rajbari) is the former residence of the kings of Natore. Today it is the official residence of the Prime Minister in North Bengal.

Notable persons 
 
 

 Maharaja Jagadindra Nath Roy Bahadur (1868–1925) known as the Maharaja of Natore was a noted Jamindar of Natore from Bengal. He is also noted for his contribution to the game of cricket in British India.
 Rani Bhabani (1715–1802) was an independent Jamindar of Natore during 1748-1802 British India.
 Madar Bux (1907 – January 20, 1967) was a Bengali politician. He served in the northern city of Rajshahi
 Ashraf Ali Khan Chowdhury - Bengali lawyer and politician
 Taijul Islam Bangladeshi cricketer
 Zunaid Ahmed Palak – MP
 Farida Parveen, Bangladeshi folk singer
 Sarat Kumar Rai (1876–1946)
 Shankar Gobind Chowdhury is a Bangladesh Awami League politician and the former Member of Parliament of Natore-2. He was the organizer of the Liberation War of Bangladesh.
 M. M. Rahmatullah was a bureaucrat and politician. He was the former Chief Engineer of the Public Works Department and later the chairman of the Capital Development Authority of the Government of Bangladesh. In 2000, he was an electoral candidate from Natore Area for the Parliament of Bangladesh (village-Hulhulia).
 Jadunath Sarkar (1870–1958)
 Banalata Sen of Natore (fictional character)
 Haji Belal Uddin(1880-1994)was a renowned business man of Natore and Dhaka. He was a Notore  based businessman who was born at Dhaka. His main business was exporting Leather. He is the only one person at that time in  entire Natore who used to pet a Tiger.He was famous for his luxurious life and piousness. He went to Makka in the year of 1940. He was the owner of Geeti Cinema Hall, JB Market at Natore.  His descendents now lives in USA, Dhaka and Natore.His two sons were settled business man another one was a journalist and the last one was a politician.
 Sultana Zaman

See also 
 Zamindar of Natore
 Singra Natore Family
 Maharajas of Dighapatia
 Maharajas of Natore
 Rajshahi Division
 Districts of Bangladesh

Notes

References 

 
Districts of Bangladesh